Spiky Harold is a platform video game written by Andrew Rogers and published by Firebird Software in 1986. It was released for Amstrad CPC, Atari 8-bit, Commodore 16 / Commodore Plus/4, Commodore 64 and ZX Spectrum home computers.

Plot
As winter approaches, a hedgehog named Harold must get ready for hibernation by gathering food that is buried beneath the hedgerows.

Gameplay

Spiky Harold is a flip-screen platform game in which the player moves the protagonist, Harold, from room to room collecting various objects. The goal of this game is to collect enough food for Harold the hedgehog to survive on while hibernating. The necessities are strewn across and below a big hedgerow. Coins that grant extra lives, wine glasses that change Harold's directions, apples, and other food items are among the numerous things that need to be collected. Unfortunately, all the objects are guarded by wasps, rodents, sulfur clouds, and bouncing balls. All the items have to be collected within the 24 hours displayed on the clock at the bottom of the screen. If the player is successful in gathering all of the required materials within the specified time, they must then deliver Harold back to his pad, where he can sleep the winter away.

Reception
Spiky Harold received mixed reviews. Commodore User reviewer complained about the slow, repetitive gameplay and dire music detracting a lot from what could have been a good game. Stuart Kirkham writing for the Computer Gamer magazine summed up Spiky Harold as a good platform game that has plenty of entertainment to offer for a small price.

References

External links 

Spiky Harold at Atari Mania

1986 video games
Amstrad CPC games
Atari 8-bit family games
Commodore 16 and Plus/4 games
Commodore 64 games
Platform games
Video games about animals
Video games developed in the United Kingdom
ZX Spectrum games